"Yesterdays" is a 1933 song about nostalgia composed by Jerome Kern with lyrics by Otto Harbach. They wrote the song for Roberta, a musical based on the novel Gowns by Roberta by Alice Duer Miller. "Yesterdays" was overshadowed by the musical's more popular song, "Smoke Gets in Your Eyes", which was a number one hit for the Paul Whiteman orchestra.

Other recordings
Billie Holiday - 1939 and 1952 recordings 
Larry Coryell – Shining Hour (1989)
 Lee Konitz and Miles Davis -- 1949 
 Dorothy Donegan
 Clifford Brown -- Clifford Brown with Strings (1955)
 Ella Fitzgerald -- Ella Fitzgerald Sings the Jerome Kern Song Book (1963)
 Erroll Garner – Magician (1973)
 Gordon Goodwin's Big Phat Band – Act Your Age (2008)
 Stevie Holland (More Than Words Can Say, 2006)
 Stephane Grappelli and Yehudi Menuhin – Tea for Two (1977)
 Tom Harrell with Kenny Werner – Sail Away (1991)
 Coleman Hawkins – 1944
 Adam Makowicz
 Helen Merrill -- Helen Merrill (1954)
 Charles Mingus with Hampton Hawes – Mingus Three (1957)
 Oscar Peterson(1961)
 Bud Powell –  (1953)
 Leo Reisman – 1933
 Buddy Rich and Max Roach – Rich vs. Roach (1959)
 Sonny Rollins and Coleman Hawkins – Sonny Meets Hawk! (1963)
 Artie Shaw with Hank Jones – The Last Recordings: Rare and Unreleased, Vol. 1 (1954)
 Paul Smith
 Barbra Streisand - Color Me Barbra (album) 1966
 Art Tatum –  (1949)
 Lennie Tristano -- Crosscurrents (1949) 
 Marianne Faithfull -- Strange Weather (1987)
 Tito Puente -- Puente Goes Jazz (1957)

See also
List of 1930s jazz standards

References

External links
"Yesterdays" at Jazzstandards.com

Songs about nostalgia
Songs with music by Jerome Kern
Songs with lyrics by Otto Harbach
1933 songs
1930s jazz standards